Collins v Wilcock is an appellate case decided in 1984 by a divisional court of the Queen's Bench Division of the High Court of England and Wales. It is concerned with trespass to the person focusing on battery.

Collins v Wilcock is a leading case. Expanding on Lord John Holt's definition of intent in Cole v Turner, Lord Robert Goff's ruling in Collins v Wilcock narrowed the law. "An assault is committed when a person intentionally or recklessly harms someone indirectly.  A battery is committed when a person intentionally and recklessly harms someone directly." But it also says this: "An offence of Common Assault is committed when a person either assaults another person or commits a battery." It notes that the only distinction between common assault and causing actual bodily harm (under section 47 of the Offences Against the Person Act 1861) is the degree of injury.

References
Dorothy J Wilson, "Divisional Court" (1984) 48 The Journal of Criminal Law 321
(1984) 148 The Justice of the Peace Reports 692
"Notes of Cases" (1984) 148 The Justice of the Peace 621 (29 September 1984)
(1984) 79 The Criminal Appeal Reports 229
"Crime" (1984) 128 The Solicitors Journal 660 (28 September 1984)
(1984) 81 LS Gaz 2140
"Queen's Bench Division" (1985) 104 Law Notes 10 (No 1, January 1985)
[1984] The Criminal Law Review 481
"Soliciting", The Police Journal, vols 58 and 59, pp 71 and 72
"Collins v Wilcock" in "Monthly Updater" in "Law and Practice" (1984) Legal Action 
Harvey and Marston. "Collins v Wilcock". Cases and Commentary on Tort. Sixth Edition. Oxford University Press. 2009. Pages 350 to 353. See further pages 354 to 356, 358 and 360.
Dias (ed). Clerk and Lindsell on Torts. Sixteenth Edition. Sweet & Maxwell. 1989. Paragraphs 17-01, 17-04, 17-05, 22-119 and 27-113.
Archbold Criminal Pleading, Evidence and Practice. 1999 Edition. Paragraphs 19-171, 19-175 and 19-271.

United Kingdom tort case law